Dimitra Dova (born July 2, 1974 in Athens) is a Greek sprinter, who specialized in the 400 metres. She won the gold medal for her category at the 2005 Mediterranean Games in Almería, Spain, with a time of 52.67 seconds, defeating her compatriot Phara Anacharsis by three hundredths of a second (0.03).

Dova represented the host nation Greece at the 2004 Summer Olympics, coincidentally in her home city, where she placed eighth for her national sprint team in the women's 4 × 400 m relay, with a time of 3:45.70.

At the 2008 Summer Olympics in Beijing, Dova competed for the women's 400 metres this time, as an individual athlete. She ran in the fifth heat against six other athletes, including American track star Sanya Richards, who eventually won a bronze medal in the final. She finished the race in fifth place by nine hundredths of a second (0.09) behind Japan's Asami Tanno, with a time of 52.69 seconds. Dova, however, failed to advance into the semi-finals, as she placed twenty-ninth overall and was ranked below three mandatory slots for the next round.

References

External links

NBC 2008 Olympics profile

1974 births
Living people
Greek female sprinters
Olympic athletes of Greece
Athletes (track and field) at the 2004 Summer Olympics
Athletes (track and field) at the 2008 Summer Olympics
Athletes from Athens
Panathinaikos Athletics
Mediterranean Games gold medalists for Greece
Athletes (track and field) at the 2005 Mediterranean Games
Mediterranean Games medalists in athletics
Olympic female sprinters
21st-century Greek women